Sinéad Sheppard  is an Irish politician and dancing tutor, and former member of the pop group Six. She rose to fame in the 2001–02 RTÉ One television series Popstars, in which she was selected as a member of the group. After the band's swift demise, Sheppard formed her own dance school and featured as an advisor to judge John Creedon in the 2009 talent show The All Ireland Talent Show. Since 2009 she has served as a member of local councils in Cork, representing Fine Gael.

Early life
Sheppard is originally from Midleton Street in Cobh, County Cork. She is a fluent Irish speaker having been educated at Coláiste an Phíarsaigh, a gaelscoil in Glanmire, County Cork. Before being discovered by Louis Walsh, she was intending to pursue a career in public relations.

Career

Six membership
Sheppard was nineteen when she was selected as a member of Six. Her first show as a member of Six was at the ChildLine Concert in the Point Theatre, Dublin, where she performed in front of 8000 people. Six released two multi-platinum selling singles, both of which reached No. 1 in the Irish Singles Chart, and also had a top five album in Ireland. Their first single, "There's a Whole Lot of Loving" is the 3rd fastest-selling single in Irish musical history. Six did an arena tour with Westlife in England, playing a total of sixty-six shows, and two nationwide tours of Ireland.

Other musical aspirations
Sheppard attempted to audition for the first series of the British-based talent show The X Factor in 2004 alongside fellow Popstars participants Emma O'Driscoll, Andy Orr, Liam McKenna and the runner-up in the first season of the Irish-based talent show You're a Star, Simon Casey.

Television career
Sheppard featured on The All Ireland Talent Show which began in January 2009. She appeared on 1 February 2009 episode to assist John Creedon in the selection of his five acts to represent The South in the competition, specialising in dance choreography.

Politics
In the 2009 local elections, Sheppard was elected to Cobh town council for Fine Gael. She was elected to Cork County Council for the municipal area of Cobh in the 2014 local elections.

References

Living people
Irish female dancers
Fine Gael politicians
Irish television personalities
Participants in Irish reality television series
People from Cobh
Popstars winners
Irish women singers
Year of birth missing (living people)